The 2014 FIA WTCC Race of Argentina was the eighth round of the 2014 World Touring Car Championship season and the second running of the FIA WTCC Race of Argentina. It was held on 3 August 2014 at the Autódromo Termas de Río Hondo in Termas de Río Hondo, Santiago del Estero Province, Argentina.

Both races were won by José María López driving for Citroën Total WTCC.

Background
José María López led the drivers' championship coming into his home round, thirty–nine points ahead of teammate Yvan Muller. Franz Engstler held the lead of the Yokohama Trophy.

Camilo Echevarría joined Liqui Moly Team Engstler on a one–off basis, replacing Pasquale Di Sabatino. Citroën Total WTCC reverted to three cars with Ma Qing Hua missing the Argentine round.

Report

Testing and free practice
López was quickest in Friday testing ahead of Muller and the Honda of Gabriele Tarquini.

López stayed on top in free practice one on Saturday. Sébastien Loeb was second with Mehdi Bennani third in the Proteam Racing Honda.

Muller was fastest in the final practice session, morning pacesetter López was second ahead of ROAL Motorsport's Tom Chilton.

Qualifying
The first part of qualifying saw Norbert Michelisz top the times, while Belgium race two pole sitter Gianni Morbidelli did not make it through to the second part of qualifying and lined up 15th for the races.

López was quickest in the second part of qualifying; his Citroën teammates Muller and Loeb also made it through to the final part of qualifying along with Michelisz and Tiago Monteiro. Robert Huff secured pole on the race two reversed grid in his Lada.

At the end of qualifying López claimed pole position at his home race with Muller and Loeb once again making it a Citroën 1–2–3.

Race One
Michelisz and Monteiro moved up into second place and third at the start while López retained the lead. At the end of the back straight Muller and Loeb were able to repass Monteiro; Monteiro took back fourth from Loeb before Loeb nudged his way back into the position. On lap five Dušan Borković dropped from 11th to 13th having been passed by James Thompson and Morbidelli while his teammate Hugo Valente pitted with cooling problems. On lap eight Borković suffered a left rear puncture and returned to the pits for repairs. Thompson had been on the tail of Tom Coronel for the final laps and took tenth at the final corner to score his first championship point since the Race of France, the second round of the season. Lopez took victory with Michelisz holding off Muller for second, while Franz Engstler was the winner of the TC2 class.

Race Two
Huff got away from pole into the lead, Mehdi Bennani jumped up to second place while Valente dropped to fifth and got a light tap from Tarquini at the start. Muller ran wide on the first lap allowing Michelisz and López to get alongside and pass him, dropping him down to ninth. On the second lap López was on the tail of Tom Chilton for fifth place as Chilton was trying to pass Valente. The Campos Racing Chevrolet delayed López's attempt to pass Chilton. On lap five Bennani started to drop down the order as Tarquini, Monteiro and Chilton passed him followed closely by Muller and López who had finally passed Chilton. On lap six López moved up into third with the benefit of good straight line speed on the back straight. Muller was now engaged in a close battle with Chilton who was holding on to fifth place despite Muller nearly completing the moves on the a number of occasions. Morbidelli was issued with a drive–through penalty on lap six for an earlier collision with Thompson which sent the Lada driver into a half spin. López was now in second place and closing in on Huff who had led from the start. Muller had passed Chilton by lap eight and Loeb was next to try to get by the ROAL Motorsport Chevrolet. The two collided sending Chilton off onto the grass at turn 11; Chilton pulled off the circuit on lap ten and retired. On lap nine López took the lead from Huff at the end of the back straight with superior straight line speed and claimed his second win of the day. Huff was second to take Lada's first podium finish in the World Touring Car Championship ahead of Muller in third and Franz Engstler was the victor in the TC2 class once again.

After the race, Borković was excluded from the results when his car was found to be underweight in parc fermé. Echevarría was dropped one place for a controversial overtake on John Filippi.

Results

Qualifying

Bold denotes Pole position for second race.

Race 1

Bold denotes Fastest lap.

Race 2

Bold denotes Fastest lap.

 — Echevarría received a one–place penalty after the race.

Standings after the event

Drivers' Championship standings

Yokohama Trophy standings

Manufacturers' Championship standings

 Note: Only the top five positions are included for both sets of drivers' standings.

References

External links
World Touring Car Championship official website

Argentina
FIA WTCC Race of Argentina